Basopatti is a town in Madhubani District, Bihar, India. It is in Khajauli (Vidhan Sabha constituency).

References

Cities and towns in Madhubani district